Dr. B Devendrappa (1899-1986), known as the Palace Vidwan of Mysore, was one of the notable musicians in the court of Jayachamaraja Wodeyar.

B Devendrappa was the son of vocalist B S Ramayya. He was born in Ayanur village of Shimoga district, in present-day Karnataka.

He was one of the notable musicians who received various awards including Central Sangeet Natak Akademi Award in 1963. for Karnatik vocal music and Sangeetha Kalarathna award in 1971.

He was awarded Doctorate. He died in 1986, in Mysore.

Songs
One of his songs is Song Rara Enipilachitehy.

References

1899 births
1986 deaths
Male Carnatic singers
Carnatic singers
People of the Kingdom of Mysore
Singers from Mysore
20th-century Indian male singers
20th-century Indian singers
People from Shimoga district
Recipients of the Sangeet Natak Akademi Award